The 1982–83 season was FC Dinamo București's 34th season in Divizia A of Romanian association football.

Dumitru Nicolae Nicuşor is promoted as team manager, and brings the 11th championship title for Dinamo. The main rival was Sportul Studenţesc, but Dinamo took the first place at the half of the season and kept it until the final. In the Romanian Cup, Dinamo was eliminated by Universitatea Craiova in the semifinals, after the penalty kicks. After a 5-year absence, Dinamo reappears in the European Champions Cup, meeting (and eliminating) Vaaleregen Oslo. In the next stage, Dinamo had to confront a difficult opponent: the team of Vizek and Nehoda, Dukla Prague. They win at home, with 2–0, obtaining the qualification at Prague: 1–2. Dinamo is eliminated by Aston Villa, club of Bremmer, Cowans, Withe, Shaw and Morley.

Results

European Cup 

Qualifying Phase

Dinamo București won 4-3 on aggregate

First round

Dinamo București won 3–2 on aggregate

Second round

Aston Villa won 6-2 on aggregate

Squad 

Goalkeepers: Constantin Eftimescu (6 / 0); Dumitru Moraru (31 / 0).
Defenders: Marin Ion (29 / 0); Cornel Dinu (25 / 0); Alexandru Nicolae (30 / 4); Teofil Stredie (26 / 0); Nelu Stănescu (14 / 0); Nicușor Vlad (5 / 0); Laurențiu Moldovan (8 / 0); Ioan Mărginean (1 / 0).
Midfielders:  Gheorghe Mulțescu (31 / 6); Ionel Augustin (31 / 14); Marin Dragnea (30 / 7); Alexandru Custov (28 / 2); Lică Movilă (16 / 4).
Forwards: Cornel Țălnar (23 / 4); Pompiliu Iordache (26 / 5); Dudu Georgescu (8 / 5); Florea Văetuș (31 / 7); Costel Orac (30 / 4); Stere Sertov (3 / 0).
(league appearances and goals listed in brackets)

Manager: Nicolae Dumitru.

References 

 www.labtof.ro
 www.romaniansoccer.ro

1982
Association football clubs 1982–83 season
Romanian football clubs 1982–83 season
1982